This article displays the qualifying draw for men's singles at the 1992 Australian Open.

Seeds

Qualifiers

Lucky losers

Qualifying draw

First qualifier

Second qualifier

Third qualifier

Fourth qualifier

Fifth qualifier

Sixth qualifier

Seventh qualifier

Eighth qualifier

Ninth qualifier

Tenth qualifier

Eleventh qualifier

Twelfth qualifier

Thirteenth qualifier

Fourteenth qualifier

Fifteenth qualifier

Sixteenth qualifier

External links
 1992 Australian Open – Men's draws and results at the International Tennis Federation

Men's Singles Qualifying
Australian Open (tennis) by year – Qualifying